Board Up the House Remixes Volume 1 is the first album in the Board Up the House Remixes series. It was released by Temporary Residence Limited on September 23, 2008. However, those ordered directly from the label were shipped out approximately one month earlier.

Packaged in a jacket featuring "remixed" album art by Jon Beasley, this release was limited to 1,000 copies on silver/orange splatter vinyl.  There is no CD version.

Track listing

References

2008 EPs
Genghis Tron albums